The Society for the Arts, Religion, and Contemporary Culture, or ARC, was founded in October 1961 by three people: Alfred Barr, the art critic and founder of the Museum of Modern Art, the theologian Paul Tillich, and Marvin Halverson, an American Protestant theologian sometime of the Chicago Theological Seminary and the author of a 1951 booklet, Great Religious Paintings.  Its aims and program are based on the deep and complex relationship between religion and the arts.  Its first board of directors included these three as well as Unitarian Universalist theologian and parish minister, James Luther Adams, principal developer of the merger forming the United Church of Christ, mythologist Joseph Campbell], Truman B. Douglass; Congregationalist parish minister and theologian Amos Wilder, and Stanley Romaine Hopper, theologian and co-founder of the first Theology and Literature program in the United States.

Among the more than 300 Fellows of the Society have been Mircea Eliade, Denise Levertov, Sallie McFague, Cleanth Brooks, Marianne Moore, W. H. Auden, and John Updike.

During the late 1960s most of the individuals involved in the published discourse pertaining to the field of theopoetics were either fellows or members of SARCC.  Another major focus of the Society has been the role of myth in culture resulting in two publications.

For decades SARCC hosted several symposia, workshops and performances per year oriented around the relationship between the arts and religion in the modern context. In the 2000s it organized several day-long conferences on "The Role of the Arts in Religious and Theological Education", hosted at Yale Divinity School, Pacific School of Religion, Lancaster Theological Seminary, And Union Theological Seminary. It later organized a three-part conference on "The Influence of Technology on the Arts and Religion." A summary of this last series, written by former President Erling Hope, is titled "Between God and Google: Reflections on the Technology Project of the Society for the Arts, Religion and Contemporary Culture" and was published in 2012 by CrossCurrents journal.

It published two periodic newsletters, "ARC Directions", and later "Seedbed". Previously it has published a periodical entitled "ARC Directions."

In 2017, under the stewardship of Executive Director Callid Keefe-Perry and President Erling Hope, SARCC merged with The Association for Theopoetics Research and Exploration (ATRE), and rebranded itself ARC: Arts Religion Culture. Its activities and programming have grown widely since then, with renewed interest in emerging art forms and artists, and in social engagement around deteriorating discourse and conditions of racial, gender and economic injustice. Its 2019 annual conference took place in Oakland, CA. Tamisha A. Tyler assumed Executive Co-Directorship with Keefe-Perry in 2019, and Ashley Theuring was elected president.

The archives of SARCC are maintained at the Andover-Harvard Theological Library

See also
Kunstreligion
Theopoetics

References

Finley Eversole, ‘Foundation for the Arts, Religion and Culture’, Theology Today, vol. 24, No. 3 (October 1967).
Betty H. Meyer, The ARC Story: A Narrative Account of the Society for the Arts, Religion and Contemporary Culture (New York, Association for Religion and Intellectual Life, 2003).

Religion and the arts
Arts organizations based in the United States
Religious organizations based in the United States
Organizations based in New York (state)
Organizations established in 1961
1961 establishments in the United States